Lasiopetalum membranaceum is a species of flowering plant in the family Malvaceae and is endemic to a small region of eastern Tasmania. It is a low, spreading shrub with thin, rusty-hairy branches, narrow oblong leaves and drooping, star-shaped red to greyish-pink or white flowers.

Description
The flowers are borne in drooping groups with brown sepal-like bracts and red to greyish-pink or white petal-like sepals.

Taxonomy
Lasiopetalum micranthum was first formally described in 1855 by Joseph Dalton Hooker in The botany of the Antarctic voyage of H.M. Discovery ships Erebus and Terror from a specimen collected by Ronald Campbell Gunn. The specific epithet (micranthum) means "small-flowered".

Distribution and habitat

Conservation status
Lasiopetalum micranthum is listed as "rare" under the Tasmanian Government Threatened Species Protection Act 1995.

References

micranthum
Malvales of Australia
Flora of Tasmania
Taxa named by Joseph Dalton Hooker
Plants described in 1855